John F. Kelly is an American-based researcher and professor of addiction medicine at Harvard Medical School. He is the Founder and Director of the Massachusetts General Hospital Recovery Research Institute, Associate Director of the MGH Center for Addiction Medicine, and Program Director of the MGH Addiction Recovery Management Service.

Education 
Kelly obtained his bachelor’s degree in psychology from Tufts University and doctorate at the University of California, San Diego in Clinical Psychology.

Career 
In 2006 Kelly was named the Elizabeth R. Spallin Professor of Psychiatry in Addiction Medicine at Harvard Medical School. In 2013, he established The Recovery Research Institute, which is a part of the Massachusetts General Hospital Department of Psychiatry. This institute is credited for its creation of the Addictionary, a glossary of addiction-related terms and a system for stigmatized terminology alerts.

Kelly is a Fellow of the American Psychological Association and a Diplomat of the American Board of Professional Psychology, as well as a former President of the APA's Society of Addiction Psychology. He's worked as a consultant for federal and non-governmental agencies in the United States such as the White House Office of National Drug Control Policy, the Substance Abuse and Mental Health Services Administration, the National Institutes of Health, Hazelden Betty Ford Foundation, the Caron Foundation, as well as international governments and the United Nations.

In April 2022, Kelly was awarded the Lifetime Achievement Award from the National Council for Mental Wellbeing.

Select publications 
 1998: The effect of depression on return to drinking: A prospective study
 2000: A multivariate process model of adolescent 12-step attendance and substance use outcome following inpatient treatment
 2002: Do adolescents affiliate with 12-step groups? A multivariate process model of effects
 2003: Self-help for substance use disorders: History, effectiveness, knowledge gaps and research opportunities
 2004: Relapse prevention for substance use disorders: Adapting the adult-based paradigm for youth
 2005: The effects of age composition of 12-step groups on adolescent 12-step participation and substance use outcome
 2006: A 3-year study of addiction mutual-help group participation following intensive outpatient treatment
 2007: Adolescents' participation in Alcoholics Anonymous and Narcotics Anonymous: Review, implications, and future directions
 2008: Accounting for practice-based evidence in evidence-based practice
 2009: Twelve-step facilitation in non-specialty settings
 2010: Does our choice of substance-related terms influence perceptions of treatment need? An empirical investigation with two commonly used terms.
 2011: Alcoholics Anonymous and young people
 2012: Broadening the base of addiction mutual help organizations
 2013: Mutual-help groups for alcohol and other substance use disorders
 2014: The new science on AA and 12-step facilitation
 2015: Outcomes research on 12-step programs
 2016: Twelve-step mutual-help organizations and facilitation interventions
 2017: Are societies paying unnecessarily for an otherwise free lunch? Final musings on the research on Alcoholics Anonymous and its mechanisms of behavior change
 2018: Mechanisms of behavior change in 12-step approaches to recovery in young adults
 2019: How Many Recovery Attempts Does it Take to Successfully Resolve an Alcohol or Drug Problem? Estimates and Correlates From a National Study of Recovering U.S. Adults
 2020: Alcoholics Anonymous and 12-step facilitation treatments for alcohol use disorder: A distillation of a 2020 Cochrane review for clinicians and policy makers
 2021: Addiction Recovery Mutual-Aid Organisations

References 

American addiction physicians
American psychiatrists
Fellows of the American Psychological Association
Harvard Medical School faculty
Tufts University School of Arts and Sciences alumni
University of California, San Diego alumni
Living people
Year of birth missing (living people)